World of Warcraft is a comic book series set in the Warcraft universe and released monthly in a standard American comic format.

Publication history
At the time of its conception, the ongoing comic was set for two story arcs, both six issues each. Both were set concurrent with the events of The Burning Crusade. Later, it was expanded to last 25 issues.

World of Warcraft: Ashbringer is a four-issue mini-series that ran from late 2008 to early 2009. It was written by Micky Neilson, with pencils by Ludo Lullabi and inks by Tony Washington.

On December 16, 2009, WildStorm stated that the publication of the World of Warcraft comic series had been changed from monthly issues to original graphic novels to be released in 2010. The World of Warcraft Special, World of Warcraft: Beginnings and Ends, would be the last issue released and both the original comic (planned to be renamed to Alliance from issue 26) and the future Horde title had been canceled.

Issue list

World of Warcraft

Volume 1 "Dragon Hunt"

Volume 2

Volume 3

Volume 4

Ashbringer
World of Warcraft: Ashbringer recounts the story of the Ashbringer and Alexandros Mograine.

Beginnings and Ends
World of Warcraft: Beginnings and Ends is a one-shot special issue that introduced new Alliance and Horde characters that had not been seen in the ongoing series.

Collected editions
The series has been collected into trade paperbacks:

World of Warcraft:
 Volume 1 (collects World of Warcraft #1-7, 160 pages, hardcover, Wildstorm, August 2008, Titan Books, October 2008, softcover, September 2009, Wildstorm, Titan Books)
 Volume 2 (collects World of Warcraft #8-14, 176 pages, hardcover, Wildstorm, September 2009, Titan Books, November 2008, softcover, Wildstorm, July 2010)
 Volume 3 (176 pages, hardcover, June 2010, Wildstorm)
''Ashbringer (collects mini-series, 136 pages, hardcover, Wildstorm, June 2009, Titan Books, July 2009, softcover, Wildstorm, April 2010)

Notes

References

Comics based on video games
Books based on Warcraft
Comics by Louise Simonson
Comics by Walt Simonson
Fantasy comics
2009 comics endings